Robinsons Supermarket is a supermarket chain in the Philippines and a division of Robinsons Retail Holdings, Inc. (RRHI). It is the second largest supermarket chain in the Philippines with 274 stores (as of 2020) across the Philippines.

Robinsons Supermarket is part of RRHI along with Robinsons Department Store, Handyman Do It Best, Robinsons Appliances, Toys "R" Us (Philippines), True Value (Philippines), and Southstar Drug. 

On November 21, 2018, RRHI completed the 100% acquisition of Rustan Supercenters, Inc., comprising Rustan's Supermarket, The Marketplace, Shopwise, Shopwise Express, and Wellcome Philippines.

See also
 Robinsons Retail
 Robinsons Malls

References

External links
 Robinsons Supermarket official website

Supermarkets of the Philippines
Companies based in Quezon City